Tara-Sue Barnett (born 9 October 1993) is a Jamaican athlete specialising in the discus throw. She represented her country at the 2016 Summer Olympics without qualifying for the final.

Her personal best in the event is 61.28	metres set in Irvine in 2016.

International competitions

References

1993 births
Living people
Jamaican female discus throwers
Athletes (track and field) at the 2016 Summer Olympics
Olympic athletes of Jamaica
Sportspeople from Kingston, Jamaica
Jamaican expatriates in the United States
Competitors at the 2014 Central American and Caribbean Games
20th-century Jamaican women
21st-century Jamaican women